The Philippine Basketball Association All-Star Week is a week event held in the middle of the PBA season, usually before or during the second conference, that consists of a variety of basketball events, exhibitions, and performances culminating in the All-Star Game held on Sunday night. No regular games are held during this period, which is also known as the All-Star break. Since 2017, the All-Star festivities were extended for a week, instead of starting it on a Friday.

All-Star Game

The All-Star game, held on Sunday, is the main event of the weekend.

Events of the All-Star weekend

Obstacle Challenge
From 1994 to 2002, the competition is known as the "Buzzer Beater contest".

Three-Point Shootout

Slam Dunk Contest

Blitz Game

Rookies vs. Sophomores

Team Greats vs. Team Stalwarts
From 2012 to 2014, The Rookies vs. Sophomores Blitz Game was replaced by the Team Stalwarts vs Team Greats, which each team composed of four PBA Legends and eight current PBA players. In 2016, the game was recontinued in place of the Blitz Game but stopped being held starting in 2017. The game returned in 2023 with both Team Stalwarts and Greats only composed of rookies, sophomores, and junior (third year) players.

Rookies/Sophomores vs. Juniors

Other games

References

External links

 
 
Recurring sporting events established in 1989
1989 establishments in the Philippines
Annual sporting events in the Philippines